Mohammed Usman Edu (born June 12, 1980) is a Nigerian footballer. He plays for Kwara United F.C. of Ilorin.

Career 
Otherwise called ‘Smart', Usman hails from Okene of Okene local government area of Kogi State, he has his eyes to play professional football abroad.

He played for Julius Berger F.C. of Lagos where he won a third place in the Coca-Cola FA Cup in the 2001/2002 season. He played than one season in 2004 for Jigawa Golden Stars and signed in February 2005 for Kwara United F.C.

References

1980 births
Living people
Nigerian footballers
Association football midfielders
Kwara United F.C. players
Jigawa Golden Stars F.C. players
Sportspeople from Kogi State